Igor Savić (born 31 January 1997) is a Serbian footballer who plays for Borac Čačak in the Serbian First League.

Career

Borac Čačak
Born in Čačak, he made his first football steps, when he was 6 years old. As a member of youth school, Savić signed a scholarship contract with Borac Čačak on 9 November 2012. He made his SuperLiga debut in 9th fixture of the 2015–16 season, against Novi Pazar.

International career
Savić was a member of Serbia U-16, Serbia U-17 and Serbia U-18 national teams.

Career statistics

Club

References

External links
 Igor Savić profile at Football Association of Serbia
 Igor Savić stats at utakmica.rs

1997 births
Living people
Sportspeople from Čačak
Association football forwards
Serbian footballers
FK Borac Čačak players
FK Mladost Lučani players
FK Metalac Gornji Milanovac players
Serbian SuperLiga players
Serbian First League players